The 8th constituency of Val-de-Marne is a French legislative constituency in the Val-de-Marne département.

Description

The 8th constituency of Val-de-Marne sits in the north of the department, on the border with Paris and just south of the Bois de Vincennes. The constituency was enlarged as a result of the 2010 redistricting of French legislative constituencies to include the canton of Joinville-le-Pont.

The seat has returned conservative deputies at every election since 1988, since 1997 it has been held by Michel Herbillon the long serving mayor of Maisons-Alfort.

Historic Representation

Election results

2022

 
 

 
 
 
 
|-
| colspan="8" bgcolor="#E9E9E9"|
|-

2017

 
 
 
 
 
 
|-
| colspan="8" bgcolor="#E9E9E9"|
|-

2012

 
 
 
 
 
 
|-
| colspan="8" bgcolor="#E9E9E9"|
|-

2007

 
 
 
 
 
 
 
|-
| colspan="8" bgcolor="#E9E9E9"|
|-

2002

 
 
 
 
 
|-
| colspan="8" bgcolor="#E9E9E9"|
|-

1997

 
 
 
 
 
 
 
|-
| colspan="8" bgcolor="#E9E9E9"|
|-
 
 

 
 
 
 
 

* UDF dissident

Sources
Official results of French elections from 2002: "Résultats électoraux officiels en France" (in French).

8